Hrádek nad Nisou is a town in Liberec District in the Liberec Region of the Czech Republic. It has about 7,700 inhabitants. The town centre is well preserved and is protected by law as an urban monument zone.

Administrative parts

Villages of Dolní Sedlo, Dolní Suchá, Donín, Horní Sedlo, Loučná, Oldřichov na Hranicích, Uhelná and Václavice are administrative parts of Hrádek nad Nisou.

Geography
It is located on the state border, at the tripoint of the Czech Republic, Germany and Poland. The municipal territory lies mostly in the Zittau Basin, but on the south it also extends into the Lusatian Mountains and Ještěd–Kozákov Ridge. The Lusatian Neisse River flows through the town.

History
The first written mention of Hrádek nad Nisou is from 1287. During the Hussite Wars, in 1424, the town was burned down. In 1466, the former church was replaced by a Gothic one. In the second half of the 16th century, there was a great development of the estate.

In the 19th century, Hrádek nad Nisou became industrialized. The railway was built in 1859. Engineering, chemical and textile factories were established. From the 19th century until 1972, lignite was mined in the vicinity of the town.

Until 1918, the town was part of the Austrian monarchy (Austria side after the compromise of 1867), in the Reichenberg (Liberec) district, one of the 94 Bezirkshauptmannschaften in Bohemia.

The town had a German majority. The Czech school was founded in 1925. From 1938 to 1945 it was annexed by Nazi Germany and administered as part of the Reichsgau Sudetenland. The German population was expelled after the World War II.

Demographics

Economy
The town benefits from its location near Germany and Poland. There is an industrial zone dominated by factories focused on the production of automotive parts. The largest company is Drylock Technologies, a manufacturer of diapers and other hygiene needs.

Transport
Hrádek nad Nisou lies on the railway line Liberec–Zittau–Varnsdorf.

Sights

Hrádek nad Nisou has a well preserved town centre. The most valuable building is the Church of Saint Bartholomew. Its current appearance is from 1764. The Church of Peace was built in 1900–1901 by the Lutherans. Today it is used by the Czechoslovak Hussite Church.

Twin towns – sister cities

Hrádek nad Nisou is twinned with:
 Bogatynia, Poland
 Kralupy nad Vltavou, Czech Republic
 Zittau, Germany

References

External links

Cities and towns in the Czech Republic
Populated places in Liberec District
Czech Republic–Poland border crossings
Czech Republic–Germany border crossings